Thom McDaniels is a retired Ohio high school football coach.

Coaching career
McDaniels had a 26-year head coaching career that included head coaching stops at Warren G. Harding High School, Canton McKinley High School and Massillon Jackson High School.  Overall, he was a coach for 40-years and was named to the Ohio high school coaches hall of fame.  McDaniels was twice a finalist for NFL high school coach of the year in 2004 and 2010.

1997 season
In 1997, McDaniels was named national high school football coach of the year by USA Today while leading his Canton McKinley team to state and national titles.  This was his final season in his first tenure as coach of Canton McKinley.

Notable players
McDaniels coached several notable players including  Percy Snow, Mike Doss, Maurice Clarett, and Mario Manningham.

Personal life
McDaniels is the father of Raiders head coach Josh McDaniels and Texans assistant quarterbacks coach Ben McDaniels.

References

Living people
High school football coaches in Ohio
Coaches of American football from Ohio
Year of birth missing (living people)